Heath and Holmewood is a civil parish in the North East Derbyshire district of Derbyshire, England.  The parish contains seven listed buildings that are recorded in the National Heritage List for England.  All the listed buildings are designated at Grade II, the lowest of the three grades, which is applied to "buildings of national importance and special interest".  The parish contains the villages of Heath and Holmewood, and the surrounding area.  The listed buildings consist of farmhouses, a thatched cottage, parts of a former house, a church, and the ruins of a former church.


Buildings

References

Citations

Sources

 

Lists of listed buildings in Derbyshire